The National Front (NF), formerly known as the National Fatherland Front (NFF), was an umbrella organization to the People's Democratic Party of Afghanistan (PDPA) which ruled Afghanistan from 1978–1990. NFF was established to recruit more supporters for the communist regime in Afghanistan. Between 1980 and 1982, during Babrak Karmal's rise as president, a lot of governmental propaganda was released for the support of the organization. By April 1984, the New Times (Kabul) claimed that the NFF had over 55,000 members.

Leaders (in 1984) 
Chairman of the Central Committee: Dr. Saleh Mohammad Ziarei
Vice-Chairmen of the Central Committee: Bariq Shafihi, Suleiman Laeq, Sayed Afghani, Nejmuddin Kawyani, Sayed Ekram Paygir

References

People's Democratic Party of Afghanistan
Popular fronts of communist states